Sangchin (also Romanized as Sangchīn and Sang Chīn) is a village in Hojr Rural District, in the Central District of Sahneh County, Kermanshah Province, Iran. At the 2006 census, its population was 156, in 37 families.

References 

Populated places in Sahneh County